White & Case LLP is a global  law firm based in New York City. Founded in 1901, the firm has 46 offices in 31 countries worldwide and has been ranked among the top ten firms worldwide by revenue.

History 
The firm was launched on May 1, 1901 when two Wall Street lawyers, Justin DuPratt White, 31, and George B. Case, 28, each contributed $250 to launch White & Case.

White had attended Cornell University and was married to a banking heiress while Case attended Yale, playing baseball as a student athlete. The pair had a close relationship with Henry P. Davison, a noted banker who helped create the Federal Reserve. The firm's first clients included Bankers Trust Company.

James Hurlock led the firm as chairman from 1980 to 2000. Under Hurlock, the firm tripled its roster of lawyers and expanded into multiple global markets.

As of 1989, White & Case had reported that there were no Black or Hispanic lawyers among the firm's 82 partners. According to data provided to the National Association for Law Placement, the firm reported that 9 of its 247 associates were black and that 6 had Hispanic backgrounds.

In 1994, White & Case was among the first American law firms to open offices in Vietnam. Among the firm’s first clients in the region were PetroVietnam and Vietnamese State Bank.

Duane Wall was named chairman in 2000. Although he refocused its business on New York's financial services industry, Wall also oversaw a merger with the German firm Feddersen Laule Ewerwahn Scherzberg Finkelnburg Clemm. This enabled White & Case to become the first American company to enter the "top ten" firms in Germany.

On October 1, 2007, White & Case announced a new leadership team led by chairman Hugh Verrier.  Shortly after taking the reigns of the firm, Verrier retained the consulting firm of McKinsey & Company to conduct a review of its worldwide business operations.

In 2010, White & Case created a Global Pro Bono Practice, focusing on three areas: access to justice, promoting the rule of law, and serving the world’s leading non-governmental organizations. The Firm was profiled by Law360 in 2012 for its pro bono efforts.

The firm's antitrust law practice has been recognized as part of the top 5 Global Elite by the Global Competition Review (GCR) in 2020.

The firm also has one of the most successful international arbitration practices in the world, having ranked first every year from 2015 to 2019, and most recently in 2021, by the Global Arbitration Review (GAR).  White & Case is also noted by GAR as having the largest portfolio valuation of any firm for 2020-2022 (a full 20 percent larger than the portfolio at the second-largest firm), and has the highest number of recognized market-leading practitioners.

In June 2020, the firm announced that it had "poached" four Winston & Strawn specialists to establish itself as a destination law firm for special-purpose acquisition companies (SPACs): Joel Rubinstein, Jonathan Rochwarger, Elliott Smith and Daniel Nussen.

Noriega controversy 
White & Case registered with the U.S. Government as a foreign agent for the Panamanian government in 1981. At the time, Panama was led by Manuel Noriega, a dictator with connections to international cocaine cartels. The representation became a significant issue for Rudolph Giuliani in his 1989 campaign for New York City Mayor. Giuliani had joined the firm in February of that year and claimed no prior knowledge of the firm’s work for the Panamanian government.

Pro bono work 
The firm was part of a program in New York City to provide pro bono legal representation to battered women seeking a divorce from their husbands.

Partner Dana Foster began working to address racial injustice in Louisiana in 2020 by representing 16 mostly Black defendants with criminal convictions issued by non-unanimous, so-called “Jim Crow” juries. Created by segregationist lawmakers in the 1880s to oppress Blacks, these laws were deemed unconstitutional in 2020 by the U.S. Supreme Court.

Notable lawyers and alumni 
 Andy Beshear - Governor of Kentucky
 Steven Beshear - Former Governor of Kentucky
 Ana Birchall - Romanian politician
 Roger Blough - former chairman of U.S. Steel
 Raoul G. Cantero III - Former Florida Supreme Court Justice
 Malik R. Dahlan - International lawyer and law professor
 Tony Garza - American lawyer
 Rudolph Giuliani - former Mayor of New York City and advisor to President Donald Trump
 Richard J. Holwell - former United States district judge of the United States District Court for the Southern District of New York
 Louis Hsieh - Chinese businessman and lawyer, and the chief financial officer (CFO) of Nio, a Chinese developer of electric and autonomous vehicles
 Irving S. Olds - American lawyer
 Stephen M. Schwebel - American judge
 Justin DuPratt White - American lawyer and co-founder of White & Case.
 Lauren Woodland - actress

See also 
List of largest United States-based law firms by profits per partner
List of largest United States-based law firms by head count

References

External links

Foreign law firms with offices in Hong Kong
Foreign law firms with offices in Japan
Law firms based in New York City
Law firms established in 1901
1901 establishments in New York City